Privett station was an intermediate station  on the Meon Valley line which ran from  to  during the first half of the 20th century. Named after the hamlet of Privett, the station was in fact over half a mile (1 kilometre) from its namesake and was built in largely uninhabited countryside.

History

Name
Opened on 1 June 1903 north of the village a few yards east of the Alton road, its only minor claim to fame was that it caused Privett Halt in Gosport to be renamed to avoid confusion. This followed an earlier dispute over the exact name of the station. It was originally to be named 'West Tisted', following the convention that stations were named after the parish they were in. The family that owned Basing Park, the country estate on the edge of which the station was sited, insisted on the station being named Privett after the hamlet that formed part of their estate. This matter, coupled to the station being sited far from any local settlements but close to the Basing Park house, led many to conclude that the station was built specifically for the owners of the Park. The fact that a new Carriage Drive was built leading from the house to the station only led credence to this rumour.

Facilities
Like all the stations on the line Privett station accommodated double railway track and long platforms capable of serving 11-coach express trains. The large station buildings, designed by T. P. Figgis, were situated on the 'Down' platform and built in a highly regarded Tudor Revival style. They incorporated quite lavish passenger facilities including a large booking office with a tiled floor and a timber framed roof, separate gentlemen's and ladies' waiting rooms (as well as a large passenger shelter on the 'Up' platform) and a refreshments room. The station building also contained the station master's accommodation and other more functional rooms such as a goods office and lamp room. A signal box on the 'Up' platform controlled trains passing through the station as well as the extensive goods yard built to the south of the station site.

Engineering works
The Meon Valley Railway was a particularly difficult line to construct (It cost the equivalent of 27 million GBP, and took 6 years to build the 22-miles of line. Its most dramatic feature was the  Privett tunnel, the northern entrance of which was close to the station.

Traffic
Given the station's remote location passenger numbers never matched the extensive facilities. In 1921, following the Meon Valley line's downgrading from a through route to a local line (see the line's main article for more information) the 'Up' platform was closed, as was the signal box, which remained in use purely to control the goods yard. All trains now called alongside the main station buildings on the former 'Down' platform.

Closure
The station remained at 'half capacity' for the next 34 years. On 7 February 1955 the station was closed (along with West Meon and Tisted stations) and all services were withdrawn. The last special train to call at the station was on 6 February 1955 when an enthusiast's special called 'The Hampshireman' briefly stopped at the station (which officially closed the next day).

The site today
The station became a private house. The platform canopy was removed during conversion. Until the 1970s a fish pond occupied the former track space between the platforms but this has since been filled in.

Public house
Following the opening of the railway a public house and hotel was built across the Alton-Gosport road from the station. This was initially named 'The Privett Bush' (a pun on the common plant named Privet). The hotel is still in business, now named 'The Angel'.

Route

See also 

 List of closed railway stations in Britain

References

External links 
  Details of route

Disused railway stations in Hampshire
Former London and South Western Railway stations
Railway stations in Great Britain opened in 1903
Railway stations in Great Britain closed in 1955